The Namibian Navy is the maritime warfare branch of the Namibian Defence Force.

History

 
Development of Namibia's navy has been slow. The force was only formally established on 11 September 1998 as a maritime wing, and in 2004 as a fully fledged navy, fourteen years after independence.

Extensive Brazilian aid has assisted in the navy's development. Initially a group of four learners were dispatched to the Naval Academy in Brazil who got complemented by ten officers from the Namibian Army who would be the core group were sent to Brazil in August 1995 after Walvis Bay had been integrated into Namibia in 1994. This group, led by Phestus Sacharia, consisted of officers such as Peter Vilho, Sinsy Nghipandua, Alweendo Amungulu and Petrus Tjandja, would be the future Headquarters staff and ship captains. Later in the 1990s, two more groups were sent to Brazil to study at Admiral Wandenkolk Instruction Center in Rio de Janeiro.

An ongoing co-operation program allows Namibian sailors and naval officers to be trained by the Brazilian Navy; by 2009, 466 seamen had been trained. Brazil also provided assistance in preparing a nautical chart of the approach to Walvis Bay and consulting in charting the outer limits of the continental shelf. The Brazilian Navy has also trained the Namibian Marine Corps.

Operations 
The Navy's maritime wing headquarters was established in 1998, while in 2000 construction of a naval base began at Walvis Bay. The first maritime wing commander was Captain Phestus Sacharia. 

The Navy has approximately 1200 personnel and deploys a small number of lightly armed patrol vessels.

The first ship to be commissioned into service was the donated patrol boat Oryx in 2002. In 2004, Brazil and Namibia signed an agreement for the delivery of a patrol boat and two smaller patrol craft. The newly built 200-ton patrol boat NS Brendan Simbwaye, built at the Brazilian shipyard INACE, was commissioned on 19 January 2009.

Role
The Ministry of Defence has outlined the naval policy as follows: 
"In peacetime, the Navy of the NDF have a role of augmenting civil offshore patrol forces, particularly providing the means and the expertise to execute enforcement action effectively. Specific tasks include assisting civil forces to combat illegal immigration, smuggling (arms, drugs etc.) and threats to the environment; conducting maritime surveillance, search and rescue; and assisting the Ministry of Fisheries with enforcing a fisheries protection regime. A longer term peacetime task is the protection of offshore oil, gas, diamonds and other installations. A navy aerial surveillance component is a necessary part of the defence system."

Fleet
The fleet is operationally divided into four squadrons, based on the different roles of the craft. The squadrons, which became active on 24 May 2018, are:
Combat Squadron
Combat Support Squadron
Coastal Patrol Squadron
Harbour Patrol Squadron

Current

Other boats
In 2012/2013 the Namibian Navy ordered 19 new craft from Kobus Naval Design and Veercraft Marine of South Africa.
 5x 4-meter-Rowboats
 5x 6-meter-RHIBs
 2x 6-meter-Harbor Patrol Boats
 2x 8-meter-Boarding Boats
 2x 8-meter-Swamp Boats
 1x 11-meter-Landing Craft
 2x 14-meter-Interceptors

Decommissioned ships
1 Imperial Marinheiro class corvette – 1025 standard tons (1954)
 NS Lt Gen Dimo Hamaambo – ex Brazilian Navy

Installations

Naval Base Capt PN Sacharia

Naval Calling Station Luderitz

Naval Training School

Old Naval Base

The 'Old Naval Base' in Walvis Bay functions as the current headquarters of the Namibian Marine Corps. The current Commandant of the Old Naval Base is Commander Rachel Tuyoleni.

Naval Base Impalila

Organisation
The navy is a hierarchical organisation with the navy commander exercising overall command. The Navy Commander is always a 2 star flag officer who is then deputized by two 1 star flag officers  heading  the  Naval Operations and the Naval Support directorates. The two directorates are made up of divisions headed by Chiefs of Staff(COS) who are usually Captain(N). Division of Naval Plans & Naval Operations falls under Naval Operations Directorate, while  Naval Personnel & Naval ICT falls under Naval Support Directorate.  The Navy is further augmented by the Namibian Marine Corps.  The navy has 1200 personnel, most of whom have been trained in Brazil and South Africa.

Command structure

Navy Commander
The following officers have held the appointment of Navy Commander or its previous title Maritime Wing Commander since the commissioning of the Maritime Wing on 11 September 1998
 1998–2002 Captain (N) Phestus Sacharia
 2002–2017 Rear Admiral Peter Vilho
 2017–2020 Rear Admiral Sinsy Nghipandua
 2020-incumbent Rear Admiral Alweendo Amungulu

Master at arms of the Navy
The Master at arms of the Navy is the senior most appointment a Warrant Officer Class one my hold at the Navy. Roles of the Master at Arms include ensuring  that discipline, drills, dressing code, performance standards and morale of the non-commissioned officers are maintained.

 1998–2007 WO1 DJ Angolo
 2007 -unknown W01 Hamunyela
 unknown-currently WO1 Kamati

Marines
The Namibian Marine Corps are a unit of the Navy. Its role is to provide naval infantry, amphibious, diving and small boat capability to the Navy. They are a battalion strong. The marines are trained by Brazilian naval instructors at the Naval Training School near Walvis Bay. The marine commandant is Captain Appolos Haimbala.

Ranks and insignia
Naval ranks and insignia are based on the Royal Navy. Non-Commissioned Officers only retain the ranks as their insignia consists of a system of chevrons. The same ranks are also used by the Namibian Marine Corps.
The highest rank in peace time a commissioned officer can attain in the navy is Rear Admiral. There may however be an exception when a naval officer is appointed as Chief of the Defence Force for which the individual which ascend to the rank of Vice-Admiral. The highest rank an enlisted member can attain is Warrant Officer Class 1 but the highest appointment  is Namibian Defence Force Sergeant Major.

Commissioned officer ranks
The rank insignia of commissioned officers.

Other ranks
The rank insignia of non-commissioned officers and enlisted personnel.

Proficiency badges

Gallery

References

Further reading
 Navy (Namibia) (2011) Retrieved 10 October 2011, from Janes articles
List of Namibian admirals

Military of Namibia
Military units and formations established in 2004
Namibia
2004 establishments in Namibia